Polyrhachis rastellata is a species of ant in the subfamily Formicinae, found in few Asian countries. Two subspecies are recognized. Some texts include many more subspecies ranks. but it is debatable about these ranks. The following two subspecies are according to AntWiki.org

Subspecies
Polyrhachis rastellata congener Santschi, 1928 – Indonesia
Polyrhachis rastellata rastellata Latreille, 1802 – Borneo, Indonesia, New Guinea, Philippines, India, Sri Lanka, Thailand, China

References

External links

 at antwiki.org
Animaldiversity.org
Itis.org

Formicinae
Hymenoptera of Asia
Insects described in 1802